Antoniotto Usodimare was one of a dozen s built for the  (Royal Italian Navy) in the late 1920s. Completed in 1929, she served in World War II.

Design and description
Their complement during wartime was 222–225 officers and enlisted men.

The Navigatoris were powered by two Parsons geared steam turbines, each driving one propeller shaft using steam supplied by four Odero-Terni-Orlando water-tube boilers.

Their main battery consisted of six  guns in three twin-gun turrets, one each fore and aft of the superstructure and the third amidships. Anti-aircraft (AA) defense for the Navigatori-class ships was provided by a pair of  AA guns in single mounts abreast the forward funnel and a pair of twin-gun mounts for  machine guns. They were equipped with six  torpedo tubes in two triple mounts amidships. The Navigatoris could carry 86–104 mines.

Construction and career
Antoniotto Usodimare was laid down by Odero-Terni-Orlando at their Genoa-Sestri Ponente shipyard on 1 May 1927, launched on 12 May 1929 and commissioned on 21 November.

In early June 1942, the  fired on the Italian destroyer Premuda (former Yugoslav destroyer Dubrovnik), mistaking her for a British destroyer owing to her similarities with a British H-class destroyer. The attack missed Premuda and struck Antoniotto Usodimare, sinking her.

Citations

Bibliography

External links
 Antoniotto Usodimare Marina Militare website

Navigatori-class destroyers
Ships built in Genoa
1929 ships
World War II destroyers of Italy
Maritime incidents in June 1942
Ships sunk by Italian submarines
Friendly fire incidents of World War II
World War II shipwrecks in the Mediterranean Sea